Tomorrowland is one of the many themed lands featured at all of the Magic Kingdom styled Disney theme parks around the world owned or licensed by The Walt Disney Company. Each version of the land is different and features numerous attractions that depict views of the future. Disneyland Park in Paris includes a similar area called Discoveryland, which shares some elements with other Tomorrowlands but emphasizes visions of the future inspired by Jules Verne.

Walt Disney was known for his futurist views and, through his television programs, showed the American public how the world was moving into the future. Tomorrowland was the realized culmination of his views. In his own words: "Tomorrow can be a wonderful age. Our scientists today are opening the doors of the Space Age to achievements that will benefit our children and generations to come. The Tomorrowland attractions have been designed to give you an opportunity to participate in adventures that are a living blueprint of our future."

Disneyland's Tomorrowland is now in its third generation, and the Magic Kingdom's Tomorrowland is in its second. The Walt Disney Company has mentioned that it wanted to keep Tomorrowland from becoming "Yesterdayland".  As a self-referential joke along this line, the 2007 Walt Disney Animation Studios film Meet the Robinsons (which is set mainly in the year 2037) features an amusement park called Todayland, which has rides that look similar to Space Mountain and Disneyland's original Rocket Jets.

Disneyland

History

Tomorrowland 1955–1966: The "original" Tomorrowland incarnation
The first Tomorrowland opened at Disneyland on July 17, 1955, with only several of its planned attractions open, due to budget cuts. The construction of the park was rushed, so Tomorrowland was the last land to be finished. It became something of a corporate showcase, despite Walt Disney's reluctance. Monsanto Company, American Motors, Richfield Oil, and Dutch Boy Paint were some of the many companies to open showcases in Tomorrowland in the first few years.

Since the park was on a strict budget, one cost-cutting idea was to reuse the sets of the Nautilus from Disney's 1954 movie 20,000 Leagues Under the Sea as a walkthrough attraction.  This remained open until 1966. For the first four years, most of Tomorrowland was generally open space and considered to be very corporate-fueled. However, the area gained more attractions as time passed, many of which have since been removed.

When Disneyland opened, Tomorrowland represented the future in the year 1986.

Tomorrowland's showpiece was the TWA Moonliner, derived from Disney's "Man In Space" television episodes developed in the 1950s. The Moonliner was the tallest structure in the park at the time, even taller than the park icon Sleeping Beauty Castle. The Moonliner hosted Rocket To The Moon which was a ride to the moon. The entrance showpiece was the clock of the world showing the time anywhere on earth. The north show building hosted Circarama U.S.A. which showed movies on nine screens, and space station X-1 which showed a satellite view of America. The south show building showed the Monsanto Hall of Chemistry, which was a walk-through tour about chemistry.  Autopia, an opening-day attraction, gave visitors a view of the National Interstate System that was to be built in the future. The attraction still remains open today, though it has been modified and rebuilt several times. This is the only attraction in Tomorrowland that has been open since opening day.

Several new attractions opened in 1955.  Among them were Tomorrowland Boats, The World Beneath Us, which showed the Earth's geology, and the Aluminum Hall of Fame, sponsored by Kaiser Aluminum. The final Tomorrowland attraction to open in 1955 was The Flight Circle which demonstrated methanol-powered model planes, boats and cars.

In 1956, Tomorrowland Boats were renamed Phantom Boats, and were closed later in the year. Dutch Boy Color Gallery opened in 1956, and sponsored Dutch Boy Paint. Two major attractions opened in 1956: the Astro Jets, where guests were able to fly their own rockets, and Skyway to Fantasyland, where guests rode "Buckets" over to Fantasyland.

In 1957, the Monsanto House of the Future, a plastic house with four wings cantilevered from a central plinth, was built. This was similar to precursors at previous World's Fairs, though those were simply homes furnished with modern conveniences and aimed at housewives. Disneyland's attraction displayed conveniences such as picture phones and television remote controls, and it introduced many people to their first microwave oven. The Viewliner also opened where guests could ride in "the fastest miniature train in the world." It closed the next year making it the shortest lived Disney attraction ever.

In 1959, three major attractions, the park's first billed E-ticket attractions, opened at Tomorrowland. These were Disneyland Monorail, Submarine Voyage, and Matterhorn Bobsleds (which later became part of Fantasyland).  These additions were collectively so large in scope that they were televised as the second opening of Disneyland. New attractions came and some went as Walt Disney focused his efforts on the 1964–65 New York World's Fair. After the Fair closed, he turned his attention to a new Tomorrowland and the Florida Project, which would later become Walt Disney World.

Tomorrowland 1967–1997: "New Tomorrowland"

By 1966, Tomorrowland was becoming quickly outdated. Most of its attractions were only there as advertisements for various sponsors, such as Monsanto, despite the 1959 Tomorrowland expansion. In 1967, the area was completely rebuilt with new attractions and scenery. The original layout was demolished, with a few exceptions, and a new set of buildings were erected. The addition of the Carousel of Progress, Adventure Thru Inner Space, an improved and larger Circle-Vision auditorium, Flight to the Moon, and the PeopleMover helped give Tomorrowland its "World on the Move" theme.

In 1973, "The World On The Move" began to change. General Electric decided to close Carousel of Progress, which later reopened at a new home in Walt Disney World in 1975 as part of its expansion. In 1974, with the American Bicentennial approaching, Disney designers seized the opportunity of the vacant carousel theater to present a large musical extravaganza called America Sings, which featured 114 Audio Animatronics. The following year, Flight to the Moon was updated into Mission to Mars, as actual flights to the moon had become a reality since the former's construction.

In 1975, construction began on Walt Disney's proposed 1965 "Space Port". In May 1977, this project opened to the public as Space Mountain. The same year, the Super Speed Tunnel was added as part of the Peoplemover experience, as the Epcot model that was formerly in the building moved to Florida.

In 1984, Circle-Vision 360 received a brand new travelogue of the United States, to replace the aging "America The Beautiful" film – American Journeys.

In 1986, two new attractions found homes in Tomorrowland: Star Tours and Captain EO. Captain EO replaced the Space Stage in September 1986, and Star Tours replaced Adventure Thru Inner Space in January 1987. Aside from the Skyway closing in 1994, Tomorrowland remained largely unchanged for much of the following decade until it was redesigned in 1998.

In 1993, The Walt Disney Company planned a major refurbishment, "Tomorrowland 2055". This Tomorrowland was planned to have more of an extraterrestrial theme, and was going to replace Mission to Mars with ExtraTERRORestrial Alien Encounter. In 1994, however, this plan was scrapped due to the poor initial financial performance of Euro Disneyland.

Tomorrowland 1995–1998: "Tomorrowland in Decline"
From 1995 to 1998 several Tomorrowland attractions were slated to be closed or remodeled. The Peoplemover, The Rocket Jets, Mission to Mars, Circle-Vision 360, Captain EO, and the Starcade were all permanently closed or planned for renovation. At this time, most of these attractions were left vacant or walled off from the public.

In 1995, the  cost of an adult day pass at Disneyland was $34.00, and a Disneyland Annual Pass was $99.00. There was only one type of annual pass—as opposed to the current tiered system—and many Southern California locals had passes. Tomorrowland quickly became a local hangout for many local junior high and high school teenagers residing in Southern California. Teenagers congregated near the Tomorrowland Terrace, which featured a live band every night.

Tomorrowland became so synonymous with Southern California teenagers at that time, popular bands began to reference the local scene in their music. Local Anaheim-area ska-rock group No Doubt named their 1995 breakthrough third album “Tragic Kingdom”, in which the final track (also entitled Tragic Kingdom) begins with the ambient sounds of faint music and park guests boarding Snow White's Scary Adventures, and an ominous, pre-recorded male voice announces "Remain seated please; permanecer sentados por favor..." Just as the song begins, the iconic scream of the Wicked Witch falling to her death (as in the Disney film Snow White and the Seven Dwarfs) can be heard. The first verse of the song says "Once was a magical place; over time it was lost. Price increased the cost, and now the fortune of the kingdom is locked up in its dungeon vaults." In reference to Disneyland's Main Street Electrical Parade, another section laments "The parade that's electrical, it serves no real purpose; Just takes up a lot of juice, just to impress us."

Ska band Jeffries Fan Club (1997) wrote a song called "12" about a high school boy who meets a 12-year-old girl at Disneyland, and Pop-Punk band the Ataris’ (1998) "San Dimas High School Football Rules" was about the lead singer going to Disneyland with a girl he met and getting on all the rides.

This influx of teenagers did cause some negative consequences to the park. Disneyland had to employ more security because many of the teenagers were not respectful to the families visiting the park.  To combat the issue of mischievous locals, Disneyland made minor changes, including an increase to both one-day and annual passes. Tomorrowland officially began its renovation in 1995. The three-year makeover started only two years after the park's last major project: the construction of Mickey's Toontown. The land was not completely closed off the entire time, but major sections were blocked off to guests, and the entrance was finally walled up in 1997. As construction continued, rumors about possible new attractions went rampant. Guests wondered if Tomorrowland would start to phase out transportation and space travel attractions (its second main focus after home technologies in the 50s) in favor of a brand new theme. By the first months of 1998, New Tomorrowland was at the forefront of every Disneyland fan's mind, and the springtime opening drew major crowds. When Tomorrowland re-opened Disneyland had raised prices and many of the locals either moved on or aged out of using Tomorrowland as a hangout.

Tomorrowland 1998–2004: The "New-New Tomorrowland" incarnation

Tomorrowland reopened on May 22, 1998, at the cost of a mere $100 million, as the land was hit with budget cuts from Disneyland's president at the time, Paul Pressler. It is loosely based on the retro-futurist concepts of Jules Verne that Disneyland Paris's Discoveryland featured. The entire land was painted in bronzes, golds, and dark browns, with occasional green highlights.  New landscaping featured apparent vegetable plots and made reference to "neo-agrarian" concepts. The flagship attraction of the makeover was the Rocket Rods, which attempted to run a fast-paced ride on the former slow-paced PeopleMover track; the ride closed two years later due to intractable mechanical problems.

Many of the attractions remained fundamentally the same, but Circle-Vision, Captain EO, and Mission to Mars were all removed. The space formerly occupied by Circle-Vision was partly used for the queue of the Rocket Rods, while Captain EO was replaced by Honey, I Shrunk the Audience and Mission To Mars was replaced by a restaurant called Redd Rockett's Pizza Port. The Rocket Jets attraction was redressed as a moving sculpture called the Observatron, while a similar attraction called the Astro Orbiter was placed at ground level in the entrance of Tomorrowland where the World Clock once stood.  The former America Sings theater became Innoventions, a technology showcase based on the Walt Disney World: EPCOT original. The famous Tomorrowland attraction Space Mountain, which had been a gleaming white color for more than twenty years, was re-painted a copperish-brown color to go along with the redesign of Tomorrowland.

Following the opening of the New Tomorrowland for the summer of 1998, the Submarine Voyage was closed in September.

In late 2003, Matt Ouimet became president of the Disneyland Resort and sought to change some of the cost-cutting trends that had become the status quo there. Space Mountain was closed for two full years while the ride was refurbished and repainted white, the original color of the attraction, and the track was completely replaced by a new track with the same track plan. The former Rocket Rods queue building was converted into Buzz Lightyear Astro Blasters for a 2005 opening.

Tomorrowland 2005–2016: Disneyland's Happiest Homecoming and Diamond Anniversary

In February 2005, Walt Disney Imagineering approved a repaint of Tomorrowland for the "Happiest Homecoming on Earth" 50th anniversary celebration. This new paint scheme resembled the 1967 Tomorrowland with predominantly white, blue, and silver, although some of the former gold and bronze colors were kept.  The largest remainder from the 1998 color scheme was the Astro Orbitor until mid-2009, when it was repainted to match the rest of the land, and mechanisms that once caused its top to rotate properly were repaired.

In 2007, as part of the Year of a Million Dreams, the Submarine Voyage reopened as Finding Nemo Submarine Voyage, with the submarines fully refurbished and repowered with batteries rather than diesel engines and the theme based on the 2003 Disney/Pixar animated film Finding Nemo.

Also in 2007, the Disneyland Monorail began phasing out its Mark V fleet of monorails in order to reverse engineer and upgrade the Mark V's to the new Mark VII models. The new Mark VII's were phased in one at a time, beginning with Red and Blue in 2008 and Orange in 2009; Purple was confirmed not to undergo an upgrade and was scrapped. These new monorails were to pay homage to the original Mark I, II, and III monorails while retaining a modern, futuristic look. The previous Mark V monorail class of trains bore more of a resemblance to the Mark IV and Mark VI monorail classes of trains used on the Walt Disney World Monorail System.

In January 2010, Honey, I Shrunk the Audience closed to make way for a revived Captain EO, which "re-opened" due to the large public backing the 3D film had received upon Michael Jackson's death in June 2009. It was a limited engagement (albeit with no set closing date), and eventually closed in July 2014 to use the theatre to present a preview of Marvel Studios' Guardians of the Galaxy. Later, starting on 26 September 2014, the Magic Eye theatre was used to present a preview of Walt Disney Animation Studios' Big Hero 6, set to have ended on 21 November 2014.

In July 2010, Disneyland's Star Wars-themed motion simulator attraction Star Tours was closed to make way for Star Tours - The Adventures Continue. The ride, which featured other Star Wars destinations in 3-D, opened on June 3, 2011.

On March 21, 2015 Innoventions closed to become transformed into the Tomorrowland Expo Center. The building was closed and converted which reopened to guests on November 16, 2015. The first floor of the building hosts the Star Wars Launch Bay, a new Star Wars exhibit with character meet and greets, displays featuring movie props and various sneak peeks behind the scenes of Star Wars: The Force Awakens and the two other future Star Wars films. The second floor formerly hosted the "Super Hero HQ", featuring meet and greets with Marvel characters Iron Man, Thor and Spider-Man with several displays from Innoventions remaining, but redressed to display Marvel's various television series and comic strips.

Tomorrowland 2016–present: The "Season of the Force" Tomorrowland incarnation
At the 2015 D23 Expo, Disney announced that on November 16, 2015, Tomorrowland would launch a Star Wars-themed "Season of the Force", in celebration of Star Wars: The Force Awakens. Among the changes launched as part of the event were the attraction Star Wars Launch Bay—an exhibition showcasing artwork and other materials related to the franchise, a Star Wars Rebels-themed update of Jedi Training Academy known as Jedi Training: Trials of the Temple, the addition of The Force Awakens-related content to Star Tours - The Adventures Continue, and a The Force Awakens-themed Space Mountain overlay known as Hyperspace Mountain. Autopia also closed for a short period of time, but reopened in early 2016, with a new blue and silver color scheme to better fit current day Tomorrowland and a new sponsorship with Honda. In 2019, Disneyland began to remove the 1998-era Tomorrowland sign and rockwork popularly known as the "French fry rocks" in order to widen walkways and improve crowd flow as part of its ongoing Project Stardust beautification and improvement project.

Attractions and entertainment
 Astro Orbiter (1998–present)
 Autopia (1955–present)
 Buzz Lightyear Astro Blasters (2005–present)
 Disneyland Monorail (1959–present)
 Disneyland Railroad (1955–present)
 Finding Nemo Submarine Voyage (2007–present)
 Space Mountain (1977–present)
 Star Tours—The Adventures Continue (2011–present)
 Star Wars Launch Bay (2015–present)
 Stitch's Interplanetary Beach Party Blast (2022—present)

Former attractions and entertainment
 Court of Honor (1955–1956)
 Phantom Boats (1955–1956)
 20,000 Leagues Under the Sea Exhibit (1955–1966)
 A Tour of the West (1955–1960)
 Hall of Aluminum Fame (1955–1960)
 Space Station X-1 (1955–1960)
 The World Beneath Us (1955–1960)
 Art Corner (1955–1966)
 Clock of the World (1955–1966)
 Flight Circle (1955–1966)
 Hobbyland (1955–1966)
 Monsanto Hall of Chemistry (1955–1966)
 Rocket to the Moon (1955–1966)
 Circle-Vision 360° (1955–1997, re-themed as Rocket Rods Queue)
 American Dairy Association Exhibit (1956–1958)
 Bathroom of Tomorrow (1956–1960)
 Our Future in Colors (1956–1963)
 Astro Jets (1956–1964)
 Avenue of the Flags (1956–1966)
 Skyway to Fantasyland (1956–1994)
 Viewliner Train of Tomorrow (1957–1958)
 Midget Autopia (1957–1966)
 Monsanto House of the Future (1957–1967)
 Mermaids (1959; 1965–1967)
 Submarine Voyage (1959–1998)
 The Art of Animation (1960–1966)
 Bell Telephone Systems Phone Exhibits (1960–1984)
 America The Beautiful (1960–1984, 1996–1997)
 Flying Saucers (1961–1966)
 New York World's Fair Exhibit (1963–1964)
 Fashions & Fabrics Through the Ages (1965)
 Carousel of Progress (1967–1973)
 Flight to the Moon (1967–1975)
 Adventure Thru Inner Space (1967–1985)
 Tomorrowland Stage (1967–1986)
 PeopleMover (1967–1995)
 Alpine Gardens (1967–1995)
 Rocket Jets (1967–1997)
 America Sings (1974–1988)
 Mission to Mars (1975–1992)
 Starcade (1977–2015)
 Halyx (1981)
 Magic Journeys (1984–1986)
 Wonders of China (1984–1994)
 Captain EO (1986–1997)
 Magic Eye Theater (1986–2015)
 Star Tours (1987–2010)
 Toy Story Funhouse (January 27, 1996 – May 27, 1996)
 Hamm's Theater with "Hamm's All-Doll Revue"
 Rocket Rods (1998–2001)
 Cosmic Waves (1998–2002)
 American Space Experience (1998–2003)
 Honey, I Shrunk the Audience (1998–2010)
 Innoventions (1998–2015)
 Radio Disney Broadcast Booth (1999–2002)
 Club Buzz (2001–2006)
 Captain EO Tribute (2010–2015)
 Super Hero HQ (2015–2016)
 Jedi Training Academy (2015–2018)

Restaurants and refreshments
 Redd Rockett's Pizza Port
 The Spirit of Refreshment
 Tomorrowland Terrace (currently themed as Galactic Grill)

Former restaurants and refreshments
 Space Bar (1955–1966)
 Yacht Club (1955–1966)
 Space Place (1977–1996)
 Lunching Pad (1977–1998)

Shops
 Autopia's Winner Circle
 Little Green Men Store Command
 The Star Trader
 Tomorrowlanding

Former shops
 The MOD Hatter (1958–2006)
 Fun Fotos (1960–1966)
 Premiere Shop (1963–2005)
 Character Shop (1967–1986)

Magic Kingdom

History

Second Tomorrowland: 1971–1994
The second Tomorrowland opened on October 1, 1971, at the Magic Kingdom in the Walt Disney World Resort, Florida, and, like at Disneyland, was opened unfinished. On opening day, there were only two attractions: the Grand Prix Raceway and the Skyway to Fantasyland.

Tomorrowland was noted for being very barren and sterile at this time, due to the land being very flat and undetailed.  A large orange wall was located past the two large show buildings, and blocked guests from walking further than the Skyway building.  The wall had a small stage built into it, and a large outdoor food court sat adjacent to it to compensate for a lack of food venues at the time.  It was removed within two years and the Carousel of Progress took its place.

The largest counter service restaurant in the Magic Kingdom was the Tomorrowland Terrace.  America the Beautiful opened in November, and Flight to the Moon opened late on Christmas Eve, 1971, due to technical problems.  The south show building received an expansion in 1972, which housed If You Had Wings. The south building was further expanded in 1973, opening the Plaza Pavilion, which was an open-air restaurant, and served as a convenient way of getting from Main Street to Tomorrowland quickly.

In 1973, the plans for Tomorrowland were finalized; and for about two years, construction was a common sight.  In 1974, Star Jets, a spinner attraction sat on the WEDWay Peoplemover station. It resembled a Saturn V Rocket like its Disneyland cousin, the Rocket Jets. The ride vehicles between the two had some differences. The Disneyland Rockets were more narrow and resembled the central Saturn V rocket more, while the Magic Kingdom's vehicles look more like jets, hence the name "Star Jets". The Space Bar, another restaurant opened below the Peoplemover station.

The next year, Space Mountain and The Carousel of Progress opened on January 15. This was the first Space Mountain to open. It was the first indoor roller coaster in Florida and was the first roller coaster to have computer aided designs, along with using zoning to have 8 trains on the track at a time. Another Railroad station was planned to be built next to the entrance and exit to Space Mountain, but due to crowds in this area, it was never built. Carousel of Progress opened on the same day, and was similar to Disneyland's version except it rotated in the opposite direction. It also had a different song: Instead of "There's a Great Big Beautiful Tomorrow", the song was "The Best Time of Your Life." In June, the second version of the WEDWay Peoplemover opened.  This Peoplemover bore resemblance to Disneyland's, but was different, in that it used linear induction motors. This means that guests could not get stuck to the tracks as they could at Disneyland if they happened to fall out of the vehicle. The only moving parts of the vehicles were the wheels and the sliding doors. The track was similar but instead of it being open air and the vehicles having roofs, the opposite is true here. Unlike Disneyland's, the Peoplemover here never changed height.

This Tomorrowland somewhat resembled Disneyland's Tomorrowland at the time, with large white buildings and clean geometric shapes. The triangular buildings at Disneyland were fully realized, and the opening of the Tomorrowland here had two enormous pylons which cascaded water down into the castle moat. Complementing the Pylons were two large blue triangular walls which also released water into the moat. These waterfalls were often shut off as the slightest change of wind could spray water all over guests. In the early 80's the Waterfalls were turned off for good, and a large mosaic was painted on the blue walls, and some blue stripes were painted on the two pylons.

The colors of Tomorrowland were mainly whites complemented with ocher on the outside. The interior of the buildings were accented with reds, oranges, yellows, and browns. In Old Tomorrowland's later years, the outside colors were changed to pinks, and blues around the Peoplemover tracks.

New Tomorrowland: 1994–present

Tomorrowland went through a drastic change in 1994. It now resembles Tomorrowland from Disneyland in California slightly, but with more color. Many of the attractions changed. Some classic Tomorrowland attractions that have closed in Disneyland still live on at the Magic Kingdom, including the Tomorrowland Transit Authority PeopleMover and the Carousel of Progress, which was moved from Disneyland to Walt Disney World in 1975.  A portion of Walt Disney's model display of the Experimental Prototype Community of Tomorrow, the first incarnation of what would become Epcot, is also used as a display visible only from the Tomorrowland Transit Authority PeopleMover, until it change the name into PeopleMover in 2022.

For most of its history, Tomorrowland's color scheme was predominantly white with soft blues, creating a retro-modernist landscape. Huge monolithic towers, spires, and clean lines completed the futuristic look. In 1994, using inspiration from Discoveryland at Disneyland Paris, Tomorrowland was completely re-built and altered to resemble a galactic spaceport as it would have been envisioned by the science-fiction comic strips of the early 20th century, like Flash Gordon and Buck Rogers. Tomorrowland has since been given a much more metallic look, along with new darker blues and purples, especially along its main concourse leading from the central hub.

A spaceship atop the Cool Scanner misting station is actually a prop from the 1986 film Flight of the Navigator.

On July 9, 2019, the old entrance sign was removed.

On September 17, 2019, a new entrance sign was built.

On October 27, 2020, Since Walt Disney World reopened, after being temporarily closed during the ongoing COVID-19 pandemic, Walt Disney World announced that all recent entertainment shows are laid off, such as Citizens of Hollywood at Disney's Hollywood Studios, due to dispute between the Actors' Equity Association and Walt Disney World.

In 2021, following Walt Disney World's reopening, Magic Kingdom announced that a new Halloween live show entitled DJ Dance Party will premiere at Rockettower Plaza Stage during Disney After Hours: BOO Bash in time for Walt Disney World's 50th anniversary celebration.

Attractions and entertainment
 Astro Orbiter (1994–present)
 Buzz Lightyear's Space Ranger Spin (1998–present)
 Monsters, Inc. Laugh Floor (2007–present)
 Space Mountain (1975–present)
 Sonny Eclipse and the Amazing Astro Organ (1995–present)
 Tomorrowland Speedway (1971–present)
 PeopleMover (1975–present)
 Walt Disney's Carousel of Progress (1975–present)

Future attractions and entertainment
 Tron Lightcycle / Run (Opening in April 4, 2023)

Former attractions and entertainment
 Flight to the Moon (1971–1975)
 Skyway to Fantasyland (1971–1999)
 Circle-Vision 360° (1971–2006)
 America the Beautiful (1971–1974, 1975–1979)
 Magic Carpet 'Round The World (1974–1975)
 American Journeys (1984–1994)
 The Timekeeper (1994–2006)
 If You Had Wings (1972–1987)
 Mission to Mars (1975–1993)
 Delta Dreamflight (1989–1998)
 ExtraTERRORestrial Alien Encounter (1995–2003)
 Push the Talking Trash Can (1995–2014)
 Tomorrowland Power & Light Co Video Arcade (1995–2015)
 Incredible Tomorrowland Expo (2013–2017, 2018)
 iCan Robot (2017–2018)
 Stitch's Alien Encounter Character Greeting! (2018–2020)
 Stitch's Great Escape! (2004–2018)

Restaurants and refreshments
 Auntie Gravity's Galactic Goodies
 Cool Ship
 Cosmic Ray's Starlight Café
 Energy Bytes
 The Lunching Pad at Rockettower Plaza
 Tomorrowland Terrace Cafe

Former restaurants and refreshments
 The Lunching Pad (Different Location) (1971–1994)
 Tomorrowland Terrace Cafe (Different Location) (1971–1994)
 Plaza Pavilion (1973–1994)
 Space Bar (1974–1994)

Shops
 Buzz Lightyear Shop
 Star Traders (Mickey's Star Traders)
 TRON Shop (Tomorrowland Launch Depot)

Former shops 
 Merchant of Venus
 Space Mountain Shop (Tomorrowland Power & Light)

Tokyo Disneyland

History

Tokyo Disneyland's Tomorrowland was designed as a loose copy of Disney World's original Tomorrowland, particularly the main entryway which features nearly identical waterfalls and blue spires flanking the walkway. As is the case with other areas of Tokyo Disneyland, Tomorrowland has fewer attractions and more open spaces than its American counterparts, a move designed to facilitate a larger number of park guests. Notably missing is a PeopleMover-type attraction, whose tracks and ride vehicles have been conspicuous features of other Tomorrowland landscapes.

Although Walt Disney originally intended Tomorrowland to be a "living blueprint" of the future, Tokyo Disneyland's Tomorrowland never directly showcased future technology, instead opting for a science fiction fantasy theme. Prominent attractions supporting this theme include Space Mountain as well as the Pan Galactic Pizza Port, a restaurant that features a large audio-animatronic pizza-making machine operated by a whimsical alien creature named Tony Solaroni. In recent years, older attractions have been replaced with newer ones that feature movie tie-ins: Buzz Lightyear's Astro Blasters and Monsters, Inc. Ride & Go Seek are two examples.

In October 2014 the Oriental Land Company announced a Beauty and the Beast-themed area to be located on the site of the now-closed Grand Circuit Raceway, making Tomorrowland's size significantly smaller. In April of 2022, the Oriental Land Company announced that Space Mountain would be completely remodeled and feature a newly added Tomorrowland Square courtyard area with space themed gardens celebrating Earth's unique place in the universe.

Attractions and entertainment
 Buzz Lightyear's Astro Blasters (2004–present)
 Monsters, Inc. Ride & Go Seek (2009–present)
 Space Mountain (1983–present)
 Star Tours—The Adventures Continue (2013–present)
 Stitch Encounter (2015–present)
 Tony Solaroni Show
 The Happy Ride With Baymax (2020–present)
 Showbase (1988–present)
 Club Mouse Beat

Former attractions and entertainment

 Eternal Seas (1983–1984)
 Magic Journeys (1985–1987)
 Skyway to Fantasyland (1983–1998)
 Circle-Vision 360° (1983–2002)
 The Timekeeper (1993–2002)
 Meet the World (1983–2002)
 Starcade (1983–2007)
 MicroAdventure! (1997–2010)
 Star Tours (1989–2012)
 Captain EO (1987–1996, 2010–2014)
 Grand Circuit Raceway (1983–2017)
 Star Jets (1983–2017)
 Showbase (1988–present)
 One Man's Dream (1988-1995)
 One Man's Dream II: The Magic Lives On (2004–2019)
 Robo Astro
 Opus Five

Restaurants and refreshments

 Pan Galactic Pizza Port
 Plazma Ray's Diner
 Soft Landing
 The Popping Pod
 The Big Pop
 Tomorrowland Terrace

Former restaurants and refreshments
 Space Place FoodPort
 Lite Bite Satellite

Shops
 Planet M
 Monsters, Inc. Company Store
 Cosmic Encounter
 Stargazer Supplies
 Treasure Comet

Former shops
 Solar Ray's Light Supplies

Disneyland Park (Paris)
Disneyland Park in Paris has a Tomorrowland with an entirely different concept, Discoveryland. European culture was used distinctively in the park and Discoveryland uses the ideas of famed European thinkers and explorers such as Leonardo da Vinci or H. G. Wells, with Jules Verne featured most prominently.  This land was heavily inspired by the abandoned Disneyland concept Discovery Bay, which would have sat at the north end of the park's Rivers of America. An example of an attraction is HyperSpace Mountain, an enclosed outer space themed roller coaster with a tongue, which is a 2 inversion element, a corkscrew and objects made to look like spaceships and asteroids.

Architecturally designed using Jules Verne's vision of the future as inspiration, the land is laid out very differently from its predecessors. Many Tomorrowland classics are featured in Discoveryland, such as Autopia and Orbitron, some in an altered way, but Space Mountain is changed the most. Its theme is Steampunk/Clockpunk, with elements of Raygun Gothic.

History
Originally conceived as Discovery Mountain, it was originally proposed to hold more than one attraction, including an improved version of Horizons from Epcot, a larger Nautilus walk-through complete with a restaurant and a free-fall ride based on Journey to the Center of the Earth. But due to budget cuts, it opened in 1995 as Space Mountain: De la Terre à la Lune (From the Earth to the Moon). Beside the Space Mountain show building is the Nautilus Lagoon, with a walk-through recreation of the Nautilus submarine from 20,000 Leagues Under the Sea.

The showcase attraction on opening day was a Circle-Vision 360 film, titled Le Visionarium. The attraction featured an eccentric time-traveling robot and his robotic assistant, who take Jules Verne into the world of today, which is pictured as the future he dreamed of. The attraction was later exported to both the Magic Kingdom and to Tokyo Disneyland.

Space Mountain was completely refurbished in 2005 for the Happiest Celebration on Earth, with a new soundtrack and special effects. Buzz Lightyear Laser Blast  opened April 8, 2006, in the former building of Le Visionarium, which closed in September 2004.

Attractions and entertainment
 Buzz Lightyear Laser Blast (2006–present)
 Orbitron – Machines Volantes (1992–present)
 Autopia (1992–present)
 Les Mystères du Nautilus (1994–present)
 Disneyland Railroad – Discoveryland Station (1992–present)
 Discoveryland Theatre :
Mickey et son Orchestre PhilharMagique - Mickey's PhilharMagic (2018–present)
 Star Tours: L'Aventure Continue – Star Tours: The Adventures Continue (2017–present)
 Hyperspace Mountain (2017–present)
 Starport

Former attractions and entertainment
 Circle-Vision 360°:
 Le Visionarium (1992–2004)
 Space Mountain: From Earth to the Moon (1995–2005)
 Discoveryland Theatre:
 Honey, I Shrunk the Audience (1999–2010)
 Captain EO (1992–1998; 2010–2015)
 Star Tours (1992–2016)
 Space Mountain Mission 2 (2005–2017)
 Le Café des Visionnaires
 Arcade Beta and Omega

Restaurants and refreshments
 Café Hyperion
 Cool Station
 Rocket Café

Former restaurants and refreshments
 Buzz Lightyear's Pizza Planet Restaurant

Shops
 Constellations
 Star Command Photographs
 Light Speed Photography
 Star Traders

Hong Kong Disneyland

Like the newer generations of the American Tomorrowlands, Hong Kong's version features an emphasis on metallic trim, with many blue and purple hues. In August 2014, UFO Zone was suspended in preparation for "Tomorrowland Party Zone", a stage as part of "Disney's Haunted Halloween".

As part of "Star Wars: Tomorrowland Takeover" event since June 2016, the first three expansion attractions were all closed. On April 5, UFO Zone has been closed in preparation for Jedi Training: Trials of the Temple that premiered on June 25. On May 2, Stitch Encounter was closed and re-themed to "Star Wars: Command Post". On June 11, when the event started, Autopia was closed.

Starting in 2017, with the opening of Stark Expo and the Iron Man Experience, the first Disney attraction to be based on a Marvel property, part of Tomorrowland will transform in phases to become Stark Expo, as part of Hong Kong Disneyland's huge expansion plan (2017–2023). The second phase will see the opening of Ant-Man and the Wasp: Nano Battle! in March 2019, taking over the former Buzz Lightyear Astro Blasters building which will be transformed into the S.H.I.E.L.D. Science and Technology Pavilion. The third and last phase will be unveiled in 2023 with the completion of the Marvel area and the opening of the planned E-Ticket Avengers Quinjet, taking over the spot of the former Autopia circuit.

Attractions and entertainment
 Ant-Man and The Wasp: Nano Battle! (as redesigned to "Stark Expo") (2019–present)
 Hyperspace Mountain (2016–present)
 Iron Man Experience (as redesigned to "Stark Expo") (2017–present)
 Iron Man Tech Showcase – Presented by Stark Industries (as redesigned to "Stark Expo")
 Orbitron (2005–present)
 Tomorrowland Stage

Future attractions and entertainment
 Avengers Quinjet Experience (2023) (also parts of "Stark Expo")

Former attractions and entertainment
 Space Mountain: Ghost Galaxy (Halloween seasonal; 2007–2013)
 Space Mountain (2005–2016)
 Muppet Mobile Lab (2008–2013)
 Autopia (2006–2016)
 Stitch Encounter (2006–2016)
 UFO Zone (2006–2016)
 Buzz Lightyear Astro Blasters (2005–2017)
 Tomorrowland Stage
 Jedi Training: Trials of the Temple (2016–2021)
 Star Wars: Command Post (2016–2021)

Restaurants and refreshments
 BB-8 Snack Cart
 Comet Café (Currently Closed)
 Starliner Diner

Former restaurants and refreshments
 Flying Saucer Snacks

Shops
 Expo Shop
 Space Traders
 Pavilion Gifts

Former shops
 Star Command Suppliers (2005–2017)

Shanghai Disneyland Park

History
Shanghai Disneyland's Tomorrowland is the newest, opening with the resort on June 16, 2016. Unlike the other 5 Tomorrowlands around the world, this one is on the left side of the park instead of being on the right side. Also this Tomorrowland does not feature Space Mountain, and instead features the TRON Lightcycle Power Run. Instead of a classic spinning rockets attraction, Shanghai's park includes a spinning Jet Packs ride. There is a new version of Disney's popular Buzz Lightyear dark ride called Buzz Lightyear Planet Rescue, utilizing new technology different from that of the versions of the ride located at other Disney parks. TRON Realm opened on September 20, 2016 to make it the first expansion for the park.

Attractions and entertainment
 Avengers Training Initiative
 Buzz Lightyear Planet Rescue (2016–present)
 Jet Packs (2016–present)
 Stitch Encounter (2016–present)
 TRON Lightcycle Power Run (2016–present)
 TRON Realm
 Tomorrowland Pavilion
 Avatar: Explore Pandora (2022-present)

Former attractions and entertainment
 Tomorrowland Pavilion
 Star Wars Launch Bay (2016–2019)

Restaurants and refreshments
 Spiral Snacks
 Stargazer Grill

Shops
 Intergalactic Imports
 The Light Stuff
 Tomorrowland Pavilion Shop
 Power Supplies

Former shops
 Imperial Trading Station

In media
 The 2010 video game Epic Mickey features a Tomorrowland-esque area named Tomorrow City, which uses elements from the Tron franchise.
 The fourth season Mad Men episode "Tomorrowland", which premiered in October 2010, is partially set at Disneyland, and at one point, Don Draper and Megan Calvet plot out the Disneyland attractions they will take Draper's children to visit, including Mr. Toad's Wild Ride.
 The 2015 film Tomorrowland by director Brad Bird, screenwriter Damon Lindelof and starring George Clooney, features a place in another dimension called Tomorrowland that is patterned after the theme park as an eponymous location and plot point.

References

 
Disneyland
Disneyland Park (Paris)
Googie architecture
Hong Kong Disneyland
Magic Kingdom
Retrofuturism
Shanghai Disneyland
Outer space in amusement parks
Themed areas in Walt Disney Parks and Resorts
Tokyo Disneyland
Amusement parks opened in 1955
1955 establishments in California
Fictional locations of Disney
Space Age